Ann Y.K. Choi is a Canadian author and educator.

Choi's debut novel, Kay's Lucky Coin Variety, was published by Simon & Schuster Canada in May 2016. The story, set in downtown Toronto during the late 1980s, was inspired by Choi's own experience working and living above her family variety store. The novel was a finalist for the 2016 Toronto Book Awards. The novel was also longlisted for the 2017 Frank Hegyi Award (Ottawa Independent Writers) and was a finalist for the 2017 Kobo Emerging Writer Prize in the literary fiction category. In November 2017, the Korean Canadian Heritage Awards committee recognized Ann for outstanding contributions to Korean culture within Canada. The award was presented to her by Consul General of the Republic of Korea, Kang Jeong-Sik.

In 2018, she was selected as a judge for the 2018 Rogers Writers' Trust Fiction Prize.

In October 2020, Ann released her children’s book, Once Upon An Hour, with Orca Book Publishers. The book made several anticipated Fall 2020 book lists including CBC Books and 49th Shelf, and was selected as Picture Book-of-the Month by The Festival of Literary Diversity (FOLD Kids).

Biography 
Ann Yu-Kyung Choi immigrated to Toronto, Ontario, Canada from Chung-Ju, South Korea, in 1975. She attended the University of Toronto for her Bachelor of Arts, where she studied English, Sociology. She also completed her Bachelor in Education at Ontario Institute for Studies in Education (OISE/UT). Choi also graduated from the Humber School for Writers working with David Adams Richards as her mentor and the Creative Writing Certificate Program at the University of Toronto's School of Continuing Studies (UTCS) with Dennis Bock, Alexandra Leggat, and Kelli Deeth as her instructors. She received the Marina Nemat Award in 2012 for top final manuscript. In 2016, she completed her Master of Fine Arts Degree (MFA) in Creative Writing from National University in San Diego, California.

For almost two decades, she has worked as a high school educator for the YRDSB and lives in Toronto with her husband and daughter.

References

External links 
 Ann Y.K. Choi Official Publisher Page
 Toronto Book Awards Website
 Official Author Website

Living people
South Korean emigrants to Canada
Canadian women novelists
21st-century Canadian novelists
Canadian people of Korean descent
Canadian writers of Asian descent
21st-century Canadian women writers
Year of birth missing (living people)